Émile Buisset (1869–1925) was a Belgian politician.

1869 births
1925 deaths
Reformist Movement politicians
21st-century Belgian politicians
Politicians from Charleroi
Walloon movement activists